Single-wavelength anomalous diffraction (SAD) is a technique used in X-ray crystallography that facilitates the determination of the structure of proteins or other biological macromolecules by allowing the solution of the phase problem. In contrast to multi-wavelength anomalous diffraction, SAD uses a single dataset at a single appropriate wavelength. One advantage of the technique is the minimization of time spent in the beam by the crystal, thus reducing potential radiation damage to the molecule while collecting data. SAD is sometimes called "single-wavelength anomalous dispersion", but no dispersive differences are used in this technique since the data are collected at a single wavelength. Today, selenium-SAD is commonly used for experimental phasing due to the development of methods for selenomethionine incorporation into recombinant proteins.

See also 
 Multi-wavelength anomalous dispersion (MAD)
 Multiple isomorphous replacement (MIR)
Anomalous scattering
Anomalous X-ray scattering
Patterson map

References

Further reading
W. A. Hendrickson (1985). "Analysis of Protein Structure from Diffraction Measurement at Multiple Wavelengths". Trans. ACA Vol 21.
J Karle (1980). "Some Developments in Anomalous Dispersion for the Structural Investigation of Macromolecular Systems in Biology". International Journal of Quantum Chemistry: Quantum Biology Symposium 7, 357–367.
J. Karle (1989). "Linear Algebraic Analyses of Structures with One Predominant Type of Anomalous Scatterer". Acta Crystallogr. A45, 303–307.
A. Pahler, JL Smith & WA Hendrickson (1990). "A Probability Representation for Phase Information from Multiwavelength Anomalous Dispersion". Acta Crystallogr. A46, 537–540.
T. C. Terwilliger (1994). "MAD Phasing: Bayesian Estimates of FA" Acta Crystallogr. D50, 11–16.
T. C. Terwilliger (1994). "MAD Phasing: Treatment of Dispersive Differences as Isomorphous Replacement Information" Acta Crystallogr. D50, 17–23.
R. Fourme, W. Shepard, R. Kahn, G l'Hermite & IL de La Sierra (1995). "The Multiwavelength Anomalous Solvent Contrast (MASC) Method in Macrocolecular Crystallography". J. Synchrotron Rad. 2, 36–48.
E. de la Fortelle and G. Bricogne (1997) "Maximum-Likelihood Heavy-Atom Parameter Refinement for Multiple Isomorphous Replacement and Multiwavelength Anomalous Diffraction Methods". Methods in Enzymology 276, 472–494.
W. A. Hendrickson and CM Ogata (1997) "Phase Determination from Multiwavelength Anomalous Diffraction Measurements". Methods in Enzymology 276, 494–523.
J. Bella & M. G. Rossmann (1998). "A General Phasing Algorithm for Multiple MAD and MIR Data" Acta Crystallogr. D54, 159–174.
J. M. Guss, E. A. Merritt, R. P. Phizackerley, B. Hedman, M. Murata, K. O. Hodgson, and H. C. Freeman (1989). "Phase determination by multiple-wavelength X-ray diffraction: crystal structure of a basic blue copper protein from cucumbers". Science 241, 806–811.
B. Vijayakumar and D. Velmurugan (2013). "Use of europium ions for SAD phasing of lysozyme at the Cu Kα wavelength" Acta Crystallogr. F69, 20–24.
J. P. Rose & B-C Wang (2016) "SAD phasing: History, current impact and future opportunities" Archives Biochem Biophys 602, 80-94.

External links
MAD phasing — an in depth tutorial with examples, illustrations, and references.

Computer programs
The SSRL Absorption Package — 
CHOOCH — 
Shake-and-Bake (SnB) — 
SHELX —

Tutorials and examples

Crystallography